The men's 1500 metres at the 2012 African Championships in Athletics was held at the Stade Charles de Gaulle on 30 June and 1 July.

Medalists

Records

Schedule

Results

Round 1
First 4 in each heat (Q) and 4 best performers (q) advance to the Final.

Final

References

Results

1500 Men
1500 metres at the African Championships in Athletics